Jolgeh-ye Khalaj-e Olya (also Romanized as Jolgeh-ye Khalaj-e ‘Olyā; also known as Jolgeh Khalaj, Jolgeh-ye Khalaj, and Jolgeh-ye Khalaj-e Bālā) is a village in Malavi Rural District, in the Central District of Pol-e Dokhtar County, Lorestan Province, Iran. At the 2006 census, its population was 761, in 182 families.

The most important person of the "jolgeh Khalaj" was the late "Mirza Abbas Judaki", 94 years old( 1921-2019), and the elder of the Karamvand tribe and Kadkhoda of the village.

References 

Towns and villages in Pol-e Dokhtar County